For the 2014 Indian general election, the candidates for the Lok Sabha (lower house of the India parliament) of the Left Democratic Fronts of Kerala were as follows:

See also
 List of Constituencies of the Lok Sabha
 List of National Democratic Alliance candidates in the 2014 Indian general election
 List of United Progressive Alliance candidates in the 2014 Indian general election
 List of West Bengal Left Front candidates in the 2014 Indian general election

References

 
Lists of Indian political candidates
Indian general elections in Kerala